Sarah Hart (née Stewart, 1880–1981) was a Canadian artist and educator.

Life and career 
Born in Saint John, New Brunswick, Sarah Hart studied at the Women's Art School, the Art Students League and The Cooper Union in New York City. An early student of John Hammond, Hart joined the teaching staff of the Applied Arts program at Mount Allison University in 1907, where she taught leather tooling until 1913. Sarah Hart married Sackville Dentist Dr. Edward Hart, a widower with three sons in 1914. She then had two children of her own before rejoining the Applied Arts faculty at Mount Allison in 1928, to teach wood carving which she taught until 1961. After her retirement she continued to paint with a local arts group.

In the 1930's and 40's Hart taught weekly painting, drawing, and sculpture art classes in local communities as a part of an extension initiative by Mount Allison University. She taught these extension courses in local communities including Amherst, NS, where high school student Alex Colville attended her classes.

During WWII she taught handcrafts including weaving, leather tooling and silverwork to Royal Canadian Air Force members in five wards of a hospital in Moncton, NB.

Collections 

 Owens Art Gallery, Mount Allison University

References 
 

19th-century Canadian artists
19th-century Canadian women artists
Artists from New Brunswick
1880 births
1981 deaths
Art Students League of New York alumni
Canadian expatriates in the United States